The Ram Rebel TRX is a 4x4 truck designed and produced by the FCA US LLC design studio for the 2016 Texas State Fair, introduced on September 29th of that year as an engineering, design and consumer-interest study.  On June 1, 2018, Mike Manley, then head of Ram and Jeep, announced a production truck based on the TRX will be produced as a 2021 model year according to the five year plan.  On August 17, 2020, the Ram TRX Launch Edition was unveiled for the 2021 model year.

Development history 
The non-production modifications of the concept prototype include 37-inch tires mounted on Mopar 18-inch bead-lock wheels featuring body color matched rings, two full size spare wheels and tires in a bed mount configuration also featuring a lockable unit housing a jack, tow strap, and room for more tools.  Other production departures include a six inch wider track with extended fenders to cover the wider wheel base, giving the truck an hourglass look when viewed from above, LED clearance lights, a tire rack mounted LED light bar, five inch side exhaust integrated into protective rock rails, skid plates, a 6.2-liter supercharged HEMI engine based on the popular Hellcat featured in Dodge Chargers, Challengers, and the Jeep Grand Cherokee Trackhawk, but detuned for the truck application to 575 horsepower mated to a TorqueFlite 8HP70 transmission and a BorgWarner 44-45 transfer case.  The drive train features four modes from which to choose: Normal, Wet/Snow, Off-road and Baja.  The rear axle is a Dynatrac Pro 60 and the vehicle also features an electronic axle locker available in all modes.  The modified suspension is built onto a stock "DS" Series Ram platform 1500 frame.  The link coil based suspension is upgraded with performance springs, 2.5-inch King Racing Shocks and feature a 40% increase in travel to 13" front and rear from the standard 9".

The interior also features multiple deviations from the stock Ram Rebel 1500 including suede inserts in the seats, "sport-sanctioned lateral support upper bolsters with embroidered logos", six point harnesses, cloth door pulls, a console shifter, a rotary selector for the various drive modes, an anodized steering wheel with accent stitching, paddle shifters, a tool bag featuring TRX labeling, carbon fiber and red metal inlays, a camera mount near the rearview mirror, and a sport bar to which the six point harnesses mount. The concept also features a non-production shade of "Header Red" that was applied in thirty different coats.

Ram announced the production model TRX Launch Edition on August 17, 2020, to be released as a 2021 model. Differences include a new body based on the 5th generation RAM Pickup, a more powerful non-detuned engine making , a functional hood scoop with integrated clearance lights, and a new interior based around the UConnect 12-inch infotainment system. Launch edition models were limited to 702 units and available in an exclusive Anvil Gray colorway.

Reception 
After the unveiling of the concept at the 2016 Texas State Fair, multiple online media published positive reactions:

"For now, all we can do is dream about owning one of these beasts as it is still just a concept vehicle."

"Ram should use this golden opportunity to put an insane, over-powered off-roading truck into production, because it will surely sell quickly, is relatively easy to build, and would be in a segment that only has one other competitor . . . It's time for Ram to build the TRX."

"Back in the day, Dodge put a Viper engine in a Ram pickup truck . . . since those glory days, there hasn’t been a true high performance truck from the car company with horns. That needs to change, and now is the time."

Production rumors 
In February 2018, Jared Belfour, citing unnamed sources, reported that two Ram Rebel models based on the Ram Rebel TRX concept will be produced.  A base version featuring a new version of the naturally aspirated 426 cubic inch (7.0L) HEMI engine and the optional Supercharged 6.2L HEMI engine as well as a 2021 release date.

Later that same year in April, also citing unnamed sources, 5thGenRams reported that the two engine options will be associated with different names where the "Ram Rebel TR" features the naturally aspirated 426 c.i.d HEMI engine and the "Ram Rebel TRX" features the supercharged 6.2L HEMI engine.

However, the 2019 Dodge Challenger SRT Hellcat Redeye was announced in August that same year which featured essentially the same engine from the Dodge Challenger SRT Demon with variations on the air intake dropping the Redeye's horsepower rating to 797 from the Demon's 808 (also, the 2019 non-Redeye Dodge Challenger SRT Hellcat features airflow improvements raising its horsepower rating to 717 over the prior year's 707).

The "Hellephant" Mopar crate engine scheduled for 2019 release unveiled at the 2018 SEMA (Specialty Equipment Manufacturer's Association) Show, a 7.0-liter supercharged ,  engine. exceeds the characteristics of the Redeye engine, but is also not expected to be part of the production Ram Rebel TRX configuration (when asked, "members of the Mopar team" responded "absolutely not" regarding whether or not the Hellephant engine was being considered for any street applications, which would necessarily rule out inclusion of the production Ram rebel TRX). As of 2021, the Ram TRX is available with a single engine option, the supercharged 6.2L Hemi V8.

Ram announced the TRX on August 17, 2020. It will be powered by a supercharged Hellcat engine producing  and will debut as a 2021 model.

In media 
The Forza Horizon 4 – Fortune Island expansion pack developed by Playground Games launched on December 13 for Xbox One and Windows 10 PC (and is included for players who own the Forza Horizon 4 Ultimate Edition, Ultimate Add-Ons Bundle, or Expansion Bundle), features the Ram Rebel TRX in concept configuration, including side exhaust, dual full sized truck bed spare tires and wheels, bed rails, hood scoop and vents, "Supercharged" badging, bead lock wheels, pistol grip transmission control, "TRX" labeled tool pouch, flat bottom red stripe steering wheel, auxiliary switches, rack lights, and more.

References 

Dodge concept vehicles
Ram Trucks
2020s cars
Pickup trucks
Rear-wheel-drive vehicles
All-wheel-drive vehicles